"The Merchant and the Alchemist's Gate" is a fantasy novelette by American writer Ted Chiang, originally published in 2007 by Subterranean Press and reprinted in the September 2007 issue of Fantasy & Science Fiction. In 2019, the novelette was included in the collection of short stories Exhalation: Stories.

Plot
Fuwaad ibn Abbas, a fabric merchant in medieval Baghdad, discovers a new shop in the marketplace. The shop owner invites Fuwaad into the back workshop to see a mysterious black stone arch which serves as a gateway into the future, which the shop owner has made by the use of alchemy. The shop owner tells him three stories of people who have traveled through the gate to meet their future selves. In the first tale, the rope-maker Hassan learns where to find a buried treasure that will make him wealthy. In the second tale, a man named Ajib steals money from his future self, leading to misfortune. In the third tale, Hassan's wife Raniya travels forward and backward in time to protect her husband and teach him how to be a good lover. When Fuwaad learns that the shop keeper has another gate in Cairo that will allow people to travel into the past, he attempts to travel backward to see his deceased wife. Although he arrives too late, he does receive a message telling him that she loved him.

Reception
Publishers Weekly wrote a positive review for the story, calling it "skillfully written". In a review of Chiang's collection Exhalation, Kirkus Reviews commented specifically on The Merchant and the Alchemist's Gate, calling it "an instant classic".

It won the 2008 Hugo Award for Best Novelette and the 2008 Nebula Award for Best Novelette.

References

Fantasy short stories
2007 short stories
Hugo Award for Best Novelette winning works
Works originally published in The Magazine of Fantasy & Science Fiction
Nebula Award for Best Novelette-winning works
Short stories by Ted Chiang
Subterranean Press books